The Northern Cape Department of Education is the department of the Government of the Northern Cape responsible for primary and secondary education within the Northern Cape province of South Africa. The political leader of the department is the Member of the Executive Council (MEC) for Education; as of 2020 this position is held by Zolile Monakali.

References

External links
Northern Cape Department of Education online
Northern Cape Department: Education – Provincial Government of South Africa

Education in the Northern Cape
Northern Cape
Ministries established in 1994
Government of the Northern Cape